Secrets & Dreams is the fourth album by cast members of the Australian television series The Saddle Club, released in April 2004. Both the album and the single "Undercover Movers & Shakers" entered the Australian charts in that month. The three previous albums by The Saddle Club achieved gold record status in Australia.

Tracks
 "Undercover Movers & Shakers"
 "Diablo"
 "It's A Lovely Day"
 "I'm A Girl"
 "L.I.F.E"
 "How I Feel"
 "Amazing New World"
 "Seasons Colours"
 "Heaven Meets The World"
 "Oop Oopee Doop I Love You"
 "I Feel So Alive"
 "Happy Every Day"
 "Stars Tonight"
 "Secrets And Dreams"

There was also a bonus disc of material from the live shows at the Sydney Royal Easter Show before audiences of 7,000 to 8,000 each day at the Sydney SuperDome.

 "Wonderland"
 "Perfect Boy"
 "We Got Style"
 "A Pony Is A Girl's Best Friend"
 "Uh-Oh"
 "Everybody Come On"
 "Hey Hey What You Say"
 "Hello World"

References

External links
 Shock Records information page on Secrets & Dreams

2004 albums